The Pulitzer Prizes were first presented in 1917. The prizes were given for American journalism and literary works published in 1916. There were initially four categories; others that had been specified in Joseph Pulitzer's request were phased in over the next few years.  The winners were selected by the Trustees of Columbia University, on advice from juries of appointed experts.

Journalism awards
A prize of $1,000 was awarded for reporting, and $500 for editorial writing. Because of an insufficient number of candidates, prizes were not issued in the three other journalism categories (public service, newspaper history, and most suggestive paper on development of the Columbia School of Journalism).

 Editorial Writing:
 Reporting:
 Herbert Bayard Swope, New York World, for articles which appeared October 10, October 15 and from November 4 daily to November 22, 1916, inclusive, entitled, "Inside the German Empire."

Letters awards
A prize of $2,000 was awarded for the best book on American history, and $1,000 for the best American biography. Prizes for the best novel and best drama were not awarded, as the jurors did not find a deserving winner.

 Biography or Autobiography:
Laura E. Richards and Maud Howe Elliott assisted by Florence Howe Hall, Julia Ward Howe (Houghton).
 History:
Jean Jules Jusserand, With Americans of Past and Present Days (Scribner)

References

Further reading

External links

Pulitzer Prizes by year
Pulitzer Prize, 1917
Pulitzer Prize, 1917